L'Article 47 is a 1913 American silent short drama film starring William Garwood, Victory Bateman, Howard Davies, Ethel Jewett, and Ernest Joy. The film is based on the 1872 French play of the same name by Adolphe Belot.

References

External links

1913 films
1913 drama films
Silent American drama films
American silent short films
American black-and-white films
American films based on plays
1913 short films
1910s American films
1910s English-language films
American drama short films